The Church of St Illtyd, Mamhilad, Monmouthshire, Wales, is a parish church with its origins in the 11th century. Renovations took place in the 19th century and again in 1999–2000. It is a Grade II* listed building and an active parish church.

History
The church dates from the medieval period but the building fabric cannot be dated with certainty. Mention of the church is made in a record of 1100. The existing features are late medieval, or of the restoration undertaken by John Prichard and John Pollard Seddon in 1864–1865. A further restoration took place in 1999–2000. The church remains an active church in the parish of Mamhilad with Monkswood with Glascoed.

Architecture and description
The church is built of Old Red Sandstone rubble. The style of the existing fabric is Perpendicular. The church comprises a nave, chancel, two porches and a bellcote. Cadw describes the rood loft as a "great rarity" and the listing record for the church's Grade II* designation notes the "extremely fine and rare rood-loft".

Notes

References
 

Mamhilad
History of Monmouthshire
Mamhilad